John B. H. Coker (born 13 February 1940) is a Sierra Leonean former boxer. He competed in the men's heavyweight event at the 1968 Summer Olympics. He was also the flag bearer for Sierra Leone at the 1968 Games.

References

External links
 

1940 births
Living people
Sierra Leonean male boxers
Olympic boxers of Sierra Leone
Boxers at the 1968 Summer Olympics
Sportspeople from Freetown
Heavyweight boxers